New Mexico Territory's at-large congressional district is an obsolete congressional district representing the New Mexico Territory, which was created in 1850. After New Mexico's admission to the Union as the 47th state by act of Congress on January 6, 1912, this district was dissolved and replaced by New Mexico's at-large congressional district.

Pre-territorial delegate
While the general boundaries of the territory were established following the Treaty of Guadalupe Hidalgo in 1848, Congress did not formally organize the territory right away. Despite the uncertain status of the region, political leaders met in September 1849, and elected Hugh N. Smith as its Congressional delegate. Smith presented his credentials to Congress on February 4, 1850, but the House refused to seat him, ruling that no territorial government existed and no authority to elect a delegate had been granted.

List of delegates representing the district 
On September 9, 1850, following the passage of the Compromise of 1850, New Mexico Territory was officially created by an act of Congress and was given the authority to elect a delegate.

References

 

Former congressional districts of the United States
At-large United States congressional districts
Territory At-large